Hudaraj (also Romanized as Hūdaraj and Hoodaraj) is a village in Seyyed Jamal ol Din Rural District, in the Central District of Asadabad County, Hamadan Province, Iran. At the 2006 census, its population was 646, in 144 families.

References 

Populated places in Asadabad County